The 1982–83 snooker season was a series of snooker tournaments played between 7 July 1982 and 27 May 1983.  The following table outlines the results for ranking events and the invitational events.


Calendar

Official rankings 

The top 16 of the world rankings, these players automatically played in the final rounds of the world ranking events and were invited for the Masters.

Notes

References

1982
Season 1983
Season 1982